Northridge is a neighborhood in the San Fernando Valley region of the City of Los Angeles. The community is home to California State University, Northridge, and the Northridge Fashion Center.

Originally named Zelzah by settlers in 1908, the community was renamed North Los Angeles in 1929 but the appellation sometimes caused confusion between North Hollywood and Los Angeles. In 1938, civic leader Carl S. Dentzel decided to rename the community to Northridge Village, which morphed into modern-day Northridge.

The Northridge area can trace its history back to the Tongva people and later to Spanish explorers. It was sold by the Mexican governor Pio Pico to Eulogio de Celis, whose heirs divided it for resale.

Population
In 2008, the city estimated that the population had increased to 61,993. In 2000 the median age for residents was 32, about average for city and county neighborhoods; the percentage of residents aged 19 to 34 was among the county's highest.

The neighborhood was considered "highly diverse" ethnically within Los Angeles, with a high percentage of Asian people for the county. The breakdown was whites, 49.5%; Latinos, 26.1%; Asians, 14.5%; blacks, 5.4%; and others, 4.6%.  Mexico (24.7%) and the Philippines (9.8%) were the most common places of birth for the 31.8% of the residents who were born abroad—an average figure for Los Angeles.

The median yearly household income in 2008 dollars was $67,906,  considered high for the city. Renters occupied 46.4% of the housing stock, and house- or apartment-owners held 53.6%. The average household size of 2.7 people was considered average for Los Angeles.

In 2000 there were 3,803 military veterans, or 8.5% of the population, a high percentage compared to the rest of the city.

Geography

Northridge touches Porter Ranch and Granada Hills on the north, North Hills on the east, Van Nuys on the southeast, Lake Balboa and Reseda on the south and Winnetka and Chatsworth on the west.<ref name=MappingLAColoredMap>[https://www.latimes.com/includes/projects/img/mapping_la/mappingla.pdf Colored map, Mapping L.A., Los Angeles Times (PDF)]</ref>

History

Indigenous peoples
The area now called Northridge was first inhabited about 2,000 years ago by the Native American Gabrielino (or Tongva) people. Among their tribal villages Totonga was nearby Northridge. The Gabrielino-Tongva people, who lived in dome-shaped houses, are sometimes referred to as the "people of the earth". They spoke a Takic Uto-Aztecan (Shoshonean) language. Their pictographs are very hard to find nowadays, and those not public, nor protected, many destroyed by the development of Greater Los Angeles; there are no public rock art sites in Los Angeles County. A replica can be seen at The Southwest Museum and there are archeological exhibits at Los Angeles County Museum of Natural History, Rancho Los Alamitos, Louis Robidoux Nature Center and El Dorado Nature Center.

Mexican land grant
In the late 1840s, Mexican Governor Pio Pico broke with the tradition of "granting" land and, instead, sold it, without the usual area limitations, to Eulogio de Celis, a native of Spain. By 1850, de Celis was in the Los Angeles census as an agriculturist, 42 years old, and the owner of real estate worth $20,000.

Land division
A few years later, the land was split up. The heirs of Eulogio de Celis sold the northernly half -  - to Senator George K. Porter, who had called it the "Valley of the Cumberland" and Senator Charles Maclay, who exclaimed: "This is the Garden of Eden." Porter was interested in ranching; Maclay in subdivision and colonization. Francis Marion ("Bud") Wright, an Iowa farm boy who migrated to California as a young man, became a ranch hand for Senator Porter and later co-developer of the  Hawk Ranch, which is now Northridge land.

Education
Thirty-four percent of Northridge residents aged 25 and older had earned a four-year degree by 2000, an average percentage for the city but high for the county. The percentages of the same-age residents with a bachelor's degree and a master's degree or higher were high for the county.

Primary and secondary schools

In 1962, Nobel Junior High School in Northridge became the first air-conditioned school in the Los Angeles school district.

In 1982 the board considered closing Prairie Street Elementary School in Northridge. It was located on the California State University, Northridge campus, and that university used Prairie as a laboratory school. In April 1983 an advisory committee of the LAUSD recommended closing eight LAUSD schools, including Prairie Street School. In August 1983 the board publicly considered closing Prairie, which had 280 students at the time. In 1984 the board voted to close the Prairie Street School. In 1985 some parents were trying to have Prairie Street School re-opened.

Secondary and lower-grade schools within the Northridge boundaries are:

Public
 Andasol Avenue Elementary School, 10126 Encino Avenue
 Alfred Bernhard Nobel Middle School, 9950 Tampa Avenue
 Topeka Drive Elementary School, 9815 Topeka Drive
 Balboa Gifted / High Ability Magnet Elementary School, alternative, 17020 Labrador Street
 Northridge Academy High School, 9601 Zelzah Avenue
 Oliver Wendell Holmes Middle School, 9351 Paso Robles Avenue
 Dearborn Street Elementary School, 9240 Wish Avenue
 Calahan Street Elementary School, 18722 Knapp Street
 Napa Street Elementary School, 19010 Napa Street
 Northridge Middle School, 17960 Chase Street
 Parthenia Street Elementary School, 16825 Napa Street

Private
 Casa Montessori, 17633 Lassen Street
 Our Lady of Lourdes, 18437 Superior Street
 Highland Hall Waldorf School, K-12, 17100 Superior Street
 Art of Learning Academy, 9535 Alden Avenue
 St. Nicholas School, elementary, 9501 Balboa Boulevard
 First Presbyterian Church of Granada Hill, elementary, 10400 Zelzah Avenue
 Cornerstone Christian Academy, 11031 Yolanda Avenue
 East Valley Academy, K-12, 20212 Londelius Street
 Abraham Joshua Heschel Day School, Elementary and Middle, 17701 Devonshire Street

 Colleges 

California State University, Northridge, or CSUN, part of the California State University system, offers bachelor's and master's degrees in a number of disciplines. The school is a major producer of K12 teachers in the region and the nation as a whole. CSUN also has engineering, business, and film programs.

CSUN had its beginnings as a college on Nordhoff Street and Etiwanda Avenue and officially opened in 1956 as "San Fernando Valley Campus of Los Angeles State College of Applied Arts and Sciences." Two years later it separated from its parent and became "San Fernando Valley State College." By the early 1970s, however, this institution became known as "California State University, Northridge." By fall of 2016, CSUN had reached enrollment of almost 40,000 students.

A 2004 study revealed that CSUN is a major contributor to the local economy: between $663 million and $686 million annually. Additionally, CSUN employs 5,800 people directly through the university and adds another 5,700 to 6,000 jobs into the local economy.

Entertainment
Motion pictures and television

Silent star Janet Gaynor and her costume-designer husband Adrian were the first owners of a spacious estate in Northridge, which was later sold to Barbara Stanwyck and Robert Taylor.  Later, actor Jack Oakie owned the property and lived on it. The Oakie house was set for the wrecking ball, but in 2010 the city agreed to buy the Tudor-style stone landmark and its  ranch estate.

Marion Marx, wife of Zeppo Marx, and Barbara Stanwyck started Marwyck Ranch as a horse breeding farm. The original house and a small portion of the ranch still exist, and is managed by the city as Oakridge Estate Park. Northridge was known as the "Horse Capital of the West," with regular Sunday horse shows, annual stampedes, and country fairs.

Devonshire Downs
In the late 1960s, Devonshire Downs was the site of two major rock music festivals. The little-known two-day 1967 Fantasy Faire and Magic Music Festival (at "Devonshire Meadows") featured The Doors, Jefferson Airplane, Country Joe and the Fish, The Grass Roots, Canned Heat, Iron Butterfly and several other bands. The better-known but confusingly named 1969 Newport Pop Festival'' was a massive three-day event that featured Jimi Hendrix and many other top acts. It took place in June and was briefly the largest music festival ever held before losing that distinction to Woodstock the following August. Like its famous successor, it had problems with large numbers of gate-crashers, and some young attendees far from home camped out nearby in sleeping bags. Unlike Woodstock, "nearby" included parts of suburban Northridge, where most of the local residents were horrified to find their neighborhoods invaded by "hippies". A ban on rock music festivals soon followed.

Earthquakes
The 1994 Northridge earthquake was named for Northridge based on early estimates of the location of the quake's epicenter; however, further refinements showed it to be technically in neighboring Reseda.  The earthquake, which occurred on a blind thrust fault, was one of the strongest ground motions ever recorded in North America. Freeways collapsed, and many  buildings suffered irreparable damages. Vertical and horizontal accelerations lifted structures off their foundations. During the 1994 quake, the Northridge Hospital Medical Center remained open and treated more  than 1,000 patients who came to the facility during the first few days after the magnitude 6.7 quake.

This was the second time in 23 years that the area had been affected by a strong earthquake. On February 9, 1971 the San Fernando earthquake (also known as the Sylmar earthquake) struck, having a magnitude of 6.5.

Points of interest
 Brent's Deli, famous deli in Northridge
 CSUN Botanic Garden
 California State University, Northridge (CSUN)
 Donald E. Bianchi Planetarium at CSUN
 Northridge Fashion Center, Regional shopping mall.
 Northridge Hospital Medical Center
 Studio 606 West, the recording studio of rock band Foo Fighters
 U.S. Metric Association is based in Northridge.

Hospital
Northridge Hospital Medical Center consists of a 411-bed hospital and serves 2 million residents of the Valley. The hospital is one of only two facilities in the Valley certified as a trauma center for treating life-threatening injuries.

Parks, recreation and sports
The Northridge Recreation Center, located at 18300 Lemarsh St., has an indoor gymnasium, without weights, which may also be used as an auditorium. Its capacity is 400. The park also has barbecue pits, a lighted baseball diamond, lighted indoor basketball courts, lighted outdoor basketball courts, a children's play area, a community room, picnic tables, a lighted soccer field, and lighted tennis courts. The Northridge Pool, on the recreation center grounds, is an outdoor heated seasonal pool.

Dearborn Park, located at 17141 Nordhoff St., is an unstaffed, unlocked park has lighted outdoor basketball courts, a children's play area, picnic tables, and lighted tennis courts.

Vanalden Park, located at 8956 Vanalden Ave., is an unstaffed pocket park, has a horseshoe pit, a jogging path, and picnic tables.

Government and infrastructure

Local government

Los Angeles Fire Department Station 70 (Northridge) and Station 103 (Northridge/CSUN) serve the community.

City of Los Angeles neighborhood councils that cover Northridge:

 Northridge East Neighborhood Council
 Northridge West Neighborhood Council
 Northridge South Neighborhood Council

The Los Angeles Police Department operates two police stations that serve Northridge:
 Devonshire Community Police Station serves residents north of Roscoe Boulevard.
 West Valley Community Police Station serves residents south of Roscoe Boulevard.

County, state, and federal representation
The Los Angeles County Department of Health Services operates the Pacoima Health Center in Pacoima, serving Northridge.

The United States Postal Service Northridge Post Office is located at 9534 Reseda Boulevard.

 Northridge is represented in the United States Senate by California's Senators Dianne Feinstein and Alex Padilla.
 In the United States House of Representatives, Northridge is located within California's 30th congressional district represented by Democrat Brad Sherman.
 In the State Assembly, Northridge is located within California's 45th State Assembly district represented by Democrat Jesse Gabriel. 
 In the California State Senate, Northridge is split between California's 18th State Senate district represented by Democrat Robert Hertzberg, and California's 27th State Senate district represented by Democrat Henry Stern.
 Northridge is located within the City of Los Angeles’ 12th City Council District represented by Councilmember Mitchell Englander.

Notable people 
Brooke Abel, Olympic synchronized swimmer
Ariane Andrew, professional wrestler
 Hal Bernson, Los Angeles City Council member, 1979-2003
 Bob Brunner, producer and screenwriter
 Champ Butler, singer
 Matt Cassel, professional football
Jarron Collins, professional basketball
Jason Collins, professional basketball
Jim Davis, actor
 Bobbi Fiedler, Congress member
 Linda Fratianne, figure skater at the 1980 Winter Olympics
Brian Grazer, film and television producer 
Cole Guttman, ice hockey player
Jackie Earle Haley, actor
Mike Houghton, professional football
Travis Kalanick, Co-founder of Uber
Ryan Kalish, professional baseball
Antonia Lofaso, celebrity chef
Casey Matthews, professional football
Kyle, entertainer
Clay Matthews, professional football player
John H. Meier, business adviser to Howard Hughes
Lynn Carey Saylor, singer, guitarist and composer
Bob Skube, professional baseball
Malcolm Smith, professional football
Eric Steelberg, cinematographer
Brian Vranesh, professional golfer
Duffy Waldorf, professional golfer
Jeff Weaver, Major League Baseball
Jered Weaver, Major League Baseball
Danny Worth, professional baseball

See also

 Reseda Boulevard

References

External links

 North Valley Regional Chamber of Commerce
 Northridge East Neighborhood Council
 Northridge West Neighborhood Council
 Northridge South Neighborhood Council
 DONE:Neighborhood Council Database
 Comments about living in Northridge
 Northridge crime map and statistics

 
Communities in the San Fernando Valley
Neighborhoods in Los Angeles
Populated places established in 1910